Hans-Hermann Hoppe (born 2 September 1949) is a German-American economist of the Austrian School, philosopher and political theorist. He is Professor Emeritus of Economics at the University of Nevada, Las Vegas (UNLV), Senior Fellow of the Ludwig von Mises Institute, and the founder and president of the Property and Freedom Society.

Hoppe identifies as an austro-libertarian and anarcho-capitalist, and has written extensively in opposition to democracy and in support of voluntary association and disassociation in his book Democracy: The God That Failed.

Life and work

Hoppe was born in Peine, West Germany, did undergraduate studies at Saarland University and received his MA and PhD degrees from Goethe University Frankfurt. He studied under Jürgen Habermas, a leading German intellectual of the post-WWII era, but gradually came to reject Habermas's ideas, and European leftism generally, regarding them as "intellectually barren and morally bankrupt."

He was a post-doctoral fellow at the University of Michigan, in Ann Arbor, from 1976 to 1978 and earned his habilitation in Foundations of Sociology and Economics from the University of Frankfurt in 1981. From 1986 until his retirement in 2008, Hoppe was a professor in the School of Business at University of Nevada, Las Vegas. He is a Distinguished Fellow of the Mises Institute, the publisher of much of his work, and was editor of various Mises Institute periodicals.

Hoppe has stated that Murray Rothbard was his "principal teacher, mentor and master". After reading Rothbard's books and being converted to a Rothbardian political position, Hoppe moved from Germany to New York City to be with Rothbard, and then followed Rothbard to the University of Nevada, Las Vegas, "working and living side-by-side with him, in constant and immediate personal contact."  According to Hoppe, from 1985 until Rothbard's 1995 death, Hoppe considered Rothbard his "dearest fatherly friend". Hoppe was also intimate friends with Ludwig von Mises.

Hoppe resides in Turkey with his wife Gülçin Imre Hoppe, an Austrian school economist.

Property and Freedom Society

In 2006, Hoppe founded The Property and Freedom Society ("PFS") as a reaction against the Milton Friedman-influenced Mont Pelerin Society, which he has derided as "socialist". On the fifth anniversary of PFS, Hoppe reflected on its goals:

Hoppe was criticized for inviting white nationalist speakers such as Jared Taylor, and neo-Nazi Richard B. Spencer, to speak at the PFS.

Creation of the Mises Institute 

As a result of the economic works of Hans-Hermann Hoppe, Murray Rothbard, Ludwig von Mises, and other Austrian economists, the Mises Institute was founded in 1982 by Lew Rockwell, Burton Blumert, and Murray Rothbard, following a split between the Cato Institute and Rothbard, who had been one of the founders of the Cato Institute.

The Mises Institute has offered thousands of free books written by Hans Hermann Hoppe, Ludwig Von Mises, Murray Rothbard,  and other prominent economists in e-book and audiobook format. It has designed a section for beginners that summarizes the main concepts in thirty minutes for those unfamiliar with the concepts of Austrian Economics. The Mises Institute also offers a graduate school program.

Argumentation ethics

In the September 1988 issue of Liberty, Hoppe attempted to establish an a priori and value-neutral justification for libertarian ethics by devising a new theory which he named argumentation ethics. Hoppe asserted that any argument which in any respect purports to contradict libertarian principles is logically incoherent.

Hoppe argued that, in the course of having an argument about politics (or indeed any subject), people assume certain norms of argumentation, including a prohibition on initiating violence. Hoppe then extrapolated this argument to political life in general, arguing that the norms governing argumentation should apply in all political contexts. Hoppe claimed that, of all political philosophies, only anarcho-capitalist libertarianism prohibits the initiation of aggressive violence (the non-aggression principle); therefore, any argument for any political philosophy other than anarcho-capitalist libertarianism is logically incoherent.

Reception
In the following issue, Liberty published comments by ten libertarians, followed by a rejoinder from Hoppe. In his comment for Liberty, Hoppe's friend and Mises Institute supervisor Murray Rothbard wrote that Hoppe's theory was "a dazzling breakthrough for political philosophy in general and for libertarianism in particular" and that Hoppe "has managed to transcend the famous is/ought, fact/value dichotomy that has plagued philosophy since the days of the Scholastics, and that had brought modern libertarianism into a tiresome deadlock". However, the majority of Hoppe's colleagues surveyed by Liberty rejected his theory. In his response, Hoppe derided his critics as "utilitarians".

Later, attorney and Mises Institute adjunct scholar Stephan Kinsella also defended Hoppe's argument, while Mises Institute economists Bob Murphy and Gene Callahan rejected Hoppe's argument. David Osterfeld, an adjunct scholar at the Mises Institute, agreed with most of Hoppe's argument in an essay, while raising a number of objections, to which Hoppe subsequently responded.

Mises Institute Senior Fellow Roderick T. Long stated that Hoppe's a priori formulation of libertarianism denied the fundamental principle of Misesean praxeology. On the issue of utilitarianism, Long wrote, "Hoppe's argument, if it worked, would commit us to recognizing and respecting libertarian rights regardless of what our goals are – but as a praxeologist, I have trouble seeing how any practical requirement can be justified apart from a means-end structure." Long reconstructed Hoppe's argument in deductively valid form, specifying four premises on whose truth the argument's soundness depends, and tried to show that each premise is either uncertain, doubtful, or clearly false. Long summarized his views by stating: 

Libertarian philosopher Jason Brennan rejected Hoppe's argument, saying: 

Another critic argued that Hoppe had not provided any non-circular reasons why we "have to regard moral values as something that must be regarded as being established through (consensual) argument instead of 'mere' subjective preferences for situations turning out in certain ways". In other words, the theory relies "on the existence [of] certain intuitions, the acceptance of which cannot itself be the result of 'value-free' reasoning."

Views on democracy

In 2001, Hoppe published Democracy: The God That Failed which examines various social and economic phenomena which, Hoppe argues, are problems caused by democratic forms of government. He attributes democracy's failures to pressure groups which seek to increase government expenditures and regulations. Hoppe proposes alternatives and remedies, including secession, decentralization of government, and "complete freedom of contract, occupation, trade and migration". Hoppe argues that monarchy would preserve individual liberty more effectively than democracy.

In 2013, Hoppe reflected on the relationship between democracy and the arts and concluded that "democracy leads to the subversion and ultimately disappearance of the notion of beauty and universal standards of beauty. Beauty is swamped and submerged by so-called 'modern art'."

Walter Block, a colleague of Hoppe's at the Mises Institute, asserts that Hoppe's arguments shed light "on historical occurrences, from wars to poverty to inflation to interest rates to crime". Block notes that while Hoppe concedes that 21st-century democracies are more prosperous than the monarchies of old, Hoppe argues that if nobles and kings replaced today's political leaders, their ability to take a long-term view of a country's well-being would "improve matters". Block also shared what he called minor criticisms of Hoppe's theses regarding time preferences, immigration and the gap between libertarianism and conservatism.

Alberto Benegas-Lynch Jr. criticized Hoppe's thesis that monarchy is preferable to democracy.
A professor of economics at the University of Buenos Aires, Benegas-Lynch provided empirical evidence demonstrating that modern monarchies tend to be far poorer than modern democracies. In response, Hoppe argued that those monarchies were poorer than democracies not because of intrinsic features of these political systems, but because the monarchies used on the study, mostly African countries, compared to the democracies, mostly European countries, led to a distortion in the study. The degree of time preference of a democracy in the present will be lower than a democracy of the past, and even lower in a democracy in the future. In order for a study to be consistent comparing both types of government, one needs to eliminate as much variables as possible, like cultural differences, sex differences, time differences, so on. Hoppe argues that this lack of proper elimination of variables led to distortions in B-L's study when comparing democracies in Europe and monarchies in Africa.

Criticism

Expulsion of homosexuals and dissidents
His belief in the right of property owners to establish libertarian communities that engage in racial discrimination, and his assertion that communities could establish exclusive criteria for admission and acceptance, have proven particularly divisive.

In Democracy Hoppe describes a fully libertarian society of "covenant communities" made up of residents who have signed an agreement defining the nature of that community. He writes that "There would be little or no 'tolerance' and 'openmindedness' so dear to left-libertarians. Instead, one would be on the right path toward restoring the freedom of association and exclusion implied in the institution of private property". He argues that towns and villages could have warning signs saying "no beggars, bums, or homeless, but also no homosexuals, drug users, Jews, Muslims, Germans, or Zulus".

Hoppe also makes plain that he believes that practicing certain forms of discrimination, including the physical removal of people whose lifestyle is deemed incompatible with the purpose of establishing certain communities, is completely compatible with his system.

Hoppe writes:

Commenting on this passage, Martin Snyder of the American Association of University Professors said Hoppe's words will disturb "[t]hose with a better memory than Hoppe for segregation, apartheid, internment facilities and concentration camps, for yellow stars and pink triangles". Hoppe also provoked controversy by calling homosexuality a "perversity or abnormality" analogous to pedophilia, drug use, pornography, polygamy and obscenity.

Walter Block wrote that Hoppe's statement calling for the physical removal of homosexuals from a libertarian political community was "exceedingly difficult to reconcile with libertarianism." Block argues that "it is entirely possible that some areas of the country, parts of Gotham and San Francisco for example, will require this practice, and ban, entirely, heterosexuality. If this is done through contract, private property rights, restrictive covenants, it will be entirely compatible with the libertarian legal code."

Support for immigration restrictions and critiques 
Although a self-described anarcho-capitalist who favors abolishing the nation-state, Hoppe also garners controversy due to his support for governmental enforcement of immigration laws, which critics argue is at odds with libertarianism and anarcho-capitalism. Hoppe argues that as long as states exist, they should impose some restrictions on immigration. He has equated free immigration to "forced integration" which violates the rights of native peoples, since if land were privately owned, immigration would not be unhindered but would only occur with the consent of private property owners.

Hoppe's Mises Institute colleague Walter Block has characterized Hoppe as an "anti-open immigration activist" who argues that, though all public property is "stolen" by the state from taxpayers, "the state compounds the injustice when it allows immigrants to use [public] property, thus further "invading" the private property rights of the original owners". However, Block rejects Hoppe's views as incompatible with libertarianism. He argues that Hoppe's logic implies that flagrantly unlibertarian laws such as regulations on prostitution and drug use "could be defended on the basis that many tax-paying property owners would not want such behavior on their own private property". Another libertarian author, Simon Guenzl, writing for Libertarian Papers argues that: "supporting a legitimate role for the state as an immigration gatekeeper is inconsistent with Rothbardian and Hoppean libertarian anarchism, as well as with the associated strategy of advocating always and in every instance reductions in the state's role in society."

In terms of specific immigration restrictions, Hoppe argued that an appropriate policy will require immigrants to the United States to display proficiency in English in addition to "superior (above-average) intellectual performance and character structure as well as a compatible system of values". He suggested that these criteria would lead to a "systematic pro-European immigration bias". Jacob Hornberger of the Future of Freedom Foundation argued that the immigration test Hoppe advocated would probably be prejudiced against Latin American immigrants to the United States.

Remarks about homosexuals and academic freedom 
Hoppe's statements and ideas concerning race and homosexuality have repeatedly provoked controversy among his libertarian peers and his colleagues at UNLV. Following a 4 March 2004, lecture on time preference at the University of Nevada, Las Vegas (UNLV), a student complained that Hoppe created a hostile classroom environment by stating that  homosexuals tend to be more shortsighted than heterosexuals in their ability to save money and plan (economically) for the future, in part because they tend not to have children. Hoppe also suggested that John Maynard Keynes's homosexuality might explain his economic views, with which Hoppe disagreed. Hoppe also stated that very young and very old people, and couples without children, were less likely to plan for the future. Hoppe told a reporter that the comments lasted only 90 seconds of a 75-minute class, no students questioned the comments in that class, and that in 18 years of giving the same lecture all over the world, he had never previously received a complaint about it. At the request of university officials, Hoppe apologized to the class. He said, "Italians tend to eat more spaghetti than Germans, and Germans tend to eat more sauerkraut than Italians" and explained that he was speaking in generalities. Thereafter, Hoppe told the reporter, the student alleged that Hoppe did not take the complaint seriously and filed a formal complaint. Hoppe told the reporter that he felt as if it were he who was the victim in the incident and that the student should have been told to "grow up".

An investigation was conducted, and the university's provost, Raymond W. Alden III, issued Hoppe a non-disciplinary letter of instruction on 9 February 2005, with a finding that he had "created a hostile or intimidating educational environment in violation of the University's policies regarding discrimination as to sexual orientation". Alden also instructed Hoppe to "... cease mischaracterizing opinion as objective fact", asserted that Hoppe's opinion was not supported by peer-reviewed academic literature, and remarked that Hoppe had "refus[ed] to substantiate [his] in-class statements of fact ..."

Hoppe appealed the decision, saying the university had "blatantly violated its contractual obligations" toward him and described the action as "frivolous interference with my right to academic freedom". He was represented by the American Civil Liberties Union. The ACLU threatened legal action. ACLU attorney Allen Lichtenstein said "The charge against professor Hoppe is totally specious and without merit". The Nevada ACLU executive director said "We don't subscribe to Hans' theories and certainly understand why some students find them offensive ... But academic freedom means nothing if it doesn't protect the right of professors to present scholarly ideas that are relevant to their curricula, even if they are controversial and rub people the wrong way". Alden's decision was picked up by Fox News and several blogs and libertarians organized a campaign to contact the university. The university received two weeks of bad publicity and the Interim Chancellor (Nevada System of Higher Education) Jim Rogers expressed concerns about "any attempts to thwart free speech".

Jim Rogers intervened in the matter. He rejected Hoppe's request for a one-year paid sabbatical, and UNLV President Carol Harter acted upon Hoppe's appeal on 18 February 2005. She decided that Hoppe's views, even if non-mainstream or controversial, should not be cause for reprimanding him. She dismissed the discrimination complaint against Hoppe, and the non-disciplinary letter was withdrawn from Hoppe's personnel file. She wrote:

Hoppe later wrote about the incident and the UNLV investigation in an article entitled "My Battle With the Thought Police". Martin Snyder of the American Association of University Professors wrote that he should not be "punished for freely expressing his opinions".

Various controversies about academic freedom, including the Hoppe matter and remarks made by Harvard University President Lawrence Summers, prompted the University of Nevada, Las Vegas, to hold a conference on academic freedom in October 2005. In 2009 UNLV proposed a new policy that included the encouragement of reporting by people who felt that they had encountered bias. The proposed policy was criticized by the Nevada ACLU and some faculty members who remembered the Hoppe incident as adverse to academic freedom.

Selected works

Books (authored)
German
 Handeln und Erkennen [Action and Cognition] (in German). Bern (1976). . .
 Kritik der kausalwissenschaftlichen Sozialforschung [Critique of Causal Scientific Social Research] (in German). Opladen: Westdeutscher Verlag (1983). . .
 Eigentum, Anarchie und Staat Property, Anarchy, and the State (in German). Opladen: Westdeutscher Verlag (1987). . .

English
 A Theory of Socialism and Capitalism. Kluwer Academic Publishers (1988). . Archived from the original.
 Audiobook, narrated by Jim Vann.
 Economic Science and the Austrian Method. Auburn, AL: Ludwig von Mises Institute (1995). .
 Audiobook, narrated by Gennady Stolyarov II.
 Democracy: The God That Failed: The Economics and Politics of Monarchy, Democracy and Natural Order. New Brunswick, NJ: Transaction Publishers (2001). . .
 The Economics and Ethics of Private Property. Auburn, AL: Ludwig von Mises Institute, 2006. [2nd ed.] .

Books (edited)
 The Myth of National Defense: Essays on the Theory and History of Security Production. Ludwig von Mises Institute (2003). . .

Book contributions
 "Introduction." [1998]. In: The Ethics of Liberty, by Murray N. Rothbard. New York University Press (1998). .
 Audiobook available.
 "Government and the Private Production of Defense." In: The Myth of National Defense: Essays on the Theory and History of Security Production. Auburn, AL: Ludwig von Mises Institute (2003), pp. 335–368. . .
 Audiobook, narrated by George Pickering.

Articles
 "On the Ultimate Justification of the Ethics of Private Property." Liberty, vol. 2, no. 1 (September 1988): 20–22.
 "Symposium: Breakthrough or Buncombe?" Liberty, vol. 2, no. 2 (November 1988): 44–54.
Symposium proceedings featuring Murray N. Rothbard, D. Friedman, L. Yeager, D. Gordon and D. Rasmussen.
 "Socialism: A Property or Knowledge Problem?" Review of Austrian Economics, vol. 9 (March 1996): 143–149. .
 "Small is Beautiful and Efficient: The Case for Secession." Telos, vol. 107 (Spring 1996).
 "The Libertarian Case for Free Trade and Restricted Immigration." Journal of Libertarian Studies, vol. 13, no. 2 (Summer 1998). Center for Libertarian Studies.
 Reprinted by the Center for Immigration Studies (May 2001).
 "On Property and Exploitation," with Walter Block. International Journal of Value-Based Management, vol. 15 (2002): 225–236.
 "My Battle with the Thought Police." Mises Daily (12 April 2005). Ludwig von Mises Institute.

Book reviews
 "In Defense of Extreme Rationalism: Thoughts on D. McCloskey's The Rhetoric of Economics." Review of The Rhetoric of Economics by Donald McCloskey. Review of Austrian Economics, vol. 3 (1989): 179–214.

Collected works
 Jacob, Thomas (editor). Hoppe Unplugged: Ansichten, Einsichten und Provokationen aus Interviews und Reden von Prof. Hans-Hermann Hoppe [in German]. Hamburg: tredition GmbH (2021). Online supplement.
"Views, insights and provocations from interviews and speeches by Prof. Hans-Hermann Hoppe."

See also 

 Anti-democratic thought
 Austrian School of Economics
 Criticism of democracy
 Dark Enlightenment
 Dialectic
 Market anarchism
 Propertarianism
 Right-libertarianism
 Soft despotism
 Totalitarian democracy
 Tyranny of the majority
 Voluntaryism

Further reading
 Hülsmann, Jörg Guido, and Stephan Kinsella (eds). Property, Freedom, and Society: Essays in Honor of Hans-Hermann Hoppe. Auburn, AL: Mises Institute, 2009.
 Deist, Jeff. "Hans-Hermann Hoppe: The In-Depth Interview." The Austrian, vol. 6, no. 2, March–April 2020, pp. 4–13.

References

External links 

 
 Hans-Hermann Hoppe, The Mises Institute
 Property, Freedom, and Society – Festschrift (essays honoring Hoppe from the Mises Institute)
 The Property & Freedom Society
 Hoppe's archives at LewRockwell.com

1949 births
Living people
20th-century American economists
20th-century American essayists
20th-century American male writers
20th-century American philosophers
20th-century German male writers
20th-century German non-fiction writers
20th-century German philosophers
21st-century American economists
21st-century American essayists
21st-century American male writers
21st-century American non-fiction writers
21st-century American philosophers
21st-century German male writers
21st-century German non-fiction writers
21st-century German philosophers
American anarcho-capitalists
American ethicists
American libertarians
American male non-fiction writers
American political philosophers
American political writers
Austrian School economists
Free speech activists
German anti-communists
German classical liberals
German economists
German emigrants to the United States
German ethicists
German libertarians
German male non-fiction writers
German political philosophers
German political writers
Goethe University Frankfurt alumni
Libertarian economists
Libertarian theorists
Mises Institute people
Non-interventionism
Paleolibertarianism
People from Peine (district)
Philosophers of law
Saarland University alumni
University of Nevada, Las Vegas faculty
University of Michigan fellows